Totally Wild is an Australian children's television series which premiered on Network 10 on 12 July 1992. The series aired on 10 Peach from 2013 to 2020, and 10 Shake from 2020 to 2021. It had a current affairs program format, and did stories on topics such as Australia's native flora and fauna, action sports, the environment, science, and technology. The show was broadcast across many countries.

Totally Wild was one of Australia's longest running children's programs and Australia's longest running C classified children's program. It celebrated its 25th anniversary on air on 22 July 2017. Original presenter Stacey Thomson (known as Ranger Stacey) remained with the program for its entire run.

On 3 February 2021, 10 announced that they had cancelled the show after 27 seasons, while the remaining episodes would continue to air. The final episode aired on 27 June 2021.

Presenters

Notable presenters and guests
 Tim Bailey
 Angela Brown
 Tim Moore (Ranger Tim)
 Jesse Baird
 Emily Barker
 Scott Bidmead
 Shae Brewster
 Hayley Chapman
 Wesley Dening
 Emily Dickson
 Natalie Hunter
 Jack Kelly
 Sami Lukis
 Brooke Marsden
 Craig McMahon
 Kellyn Morris
 Melanie Symons
 Stacey Thomson (Ranger Stacey)
 Leela Varghese
 Dr. Katrina Warren
 Courtney Wilkie
 Hayley Wilson
 Jack Yabsley
Sam Harvey

Series overview

Specials
 Totally Wild Weekend (1993)
 Totally Australia (1997)
 Totally Wild Rescue (1998)
 Totally Wild: Antarctica Special (2007)

Broadcast history

 12 July 1992 – 1996, the show aired on weekdays at 4.30pm (and on the occasional weekend morning slot at various times).
 1996 – December 2008, the show aired on Monday to Wednesday and Occasionally on Friday at 4pm (and on the occasional weekend morning slot at various times).
 6 January 2009 – 1 January 2010, it aired on Tuesday to Fridays at 7.30am, Saturdays at 9am, and on Sundays at 7am.
 4 January 2010 – 26 February 2012, it aired on Monday to Wednesday and on Fridays at 8am, and on Sundays at 7.00am.
 27 February 2012 – 30 October 2013, it aired on Monday to Wednesday at 4pm repeats at 7am, Saturdays at 8.30am and a double episode on Sundays at 7.00am.
 4 November 2013 – 26 September 2020, the series aired on 10 Peach (formerly Eleven) on Monday to Wednesday at 8am and repeats Saturdays at 8.30am. The program's change in network was due to launch of Wake Up and Studio 10.
 27 September 2020 – 4 April 2021, the series aired on 10 Shake, with new episodes on Saturday and Sunday at 11.30am.
 10 April 2021 – 27 June 2021, the series aired on 10 Shake, with new episodes on Saturday and Sunday at 6.00am.

Awards and nominations

APRA Music Awards

Logie Awards

See also

 List of longest-running Australian television series
 List of Australian television series

References

External links
 Official Website 
 
Totally Wild at the National Film and Sound Archive

1992 Australian television series debuts
2021 Australian television series endings
National Geographic (American TV channel) original programming
Network 10 original programming
10 Peach original programming
10 Shake original programming
Nature educational television series
Australian children's education television series
1990s Australian reality television series
2000s Australian reality television series
2010s Australian reality television series
2020s Australian reality television series
Television shows set in Australia
Television shows set in Brisbane
Television shows filmed in Australia